During the 1996–97 English football season, Gillingham F.C. competed in the Football League Second Division, the third tier of the English football league system.  It was the 65th season in which Gillingham competed in the Football League, and the 47th since the club was voted back into the league in 1950.  In the previous season, the team had gained promotion from the Third Division.  Prior to the new season, Gillingham signed seven new players, paying a new club record transfer fee for Watford's Andy Hessenthaler.  The team's form was poor in the first half of the season and at the end of 1996, Gillingham were in 21st position in the 24-team league table, putting them in danger of relegation back to the fourth tier.  The club signed Ade Akinbiyi from Norwich City for another record fee in early January.  In the second half of the season the team's performances improved and they finished the season in 11th position in the table.

Gillingham also competed in three knock-out competitions.  The team reached the fourth round of the Football League Cup; in the third round they held Coventry City of the FA Premier League to a draw at home and won the replay.  It was the first time Gillingham had beaten a team from the top division of English football since 1908.  They also reached the third round of the FA Cup but were eliminated from the Football League Trophy in the first round.  The team played 57 competitive matches, winning 25, drawing 12 and losing 20.  Simon Ratcliffe made the most appearances during the season, playing 52 times.  Iffy Onuora, who joined the club at the start of the season, was top goalscorer, with 21 goals in the Second Division and a total of 23 across all competitions.  The highest attendance recorded at the club's home ground, Priestfield Stadium, was 10,603, for the League Cup match against Coventry City.

Background and pre-season

The 1996–97 season was Gillingham's 65th playing in the Football League and the 47th since the club was elected back into the League in 1950 after being voted out in 1938.  In the previous season, Gillingham had finished second in the Third Division.  The team had thus been promoted to the Second Division, returning to the third tier of the English football league system for the first time since 1989.

Tony Pulis was the club's manager for a second season, having been appointed in 1995 after chairman Paul Scally purchased the club. Following the club's promotion, there was a significant turnover in the playing squad. A number of players who had been regulars at the lower level departed, including Dave Martin, captain of the promotion-winning team. Hessenthaler would go on to have a lengthy career at the club, both as a player and a manager, and in 2014 was voted Gillingham's greatest ever player by supporters.

Six other players joined the club prior to the start of the new season, four of whom incurred a transfer fee. Two further players, both defenders, arrived on free transfers: Ian Chapman from Brighton & Hove Albion and John Humphrey from Charlton Athletic. The club adopted a new kit, replacing the previous season's blue and black striped shirts with plain blue. The second-choice kit, to be worn in the event of a clash of colours with the opposition, was red. The team prepared for the new season with a number of friendly matches; most were against semi-professional non-League clubs, but the team also played Nottingham Forest of the FA Premier League.

Second Division

August–December

Gillingham began the season with a home game at Priestfield Stadium against Bristol City.  New signings Bryant, Ford, Humphrey, Hessenthaler, Chapman and Onuora were all in the starting line-up, and Piper came on as a substitute to score the winning goal in the final minute to give his team a 3–2 victory.  In the next three matches the team only managed to score a single goal, and the month of August ended with two consecutive defeats.  Gillingham beat Burnley on 7 September but then again lost twice in a row.  In the second of these defeats, a 1–0 away defeat against Walsall, Leo Fortune-West, the previous season's top goalscorer, suffered a broken ankle and was unable to play again for seven months.  In the next game, Onuora achieved the team's only hat-trick of the season, scoring all three goals in a 3–1 victory at home to Rotherham United.  The forward also scored Gillingham's only goal in each of the next three matches, which produced one win, one draw, and one defeat; after this run Gillingham were 14th in the 24-team league table.

On 15 October, Gillingham defeated Shrewsbury Town 2–1, but then began a run of five league games without a win. With Fortune-West missing, Pulis paired Onuora with various different players in the forward positions. One of these, Steve Butler, scored two penalty kicks against Millwall on 19 October, making him only the fourth player to score from more than one penalty for Gillingham in a Football League match, but Gillingham lost 3–2.

Gillingham ended the winless run with a victory over Peterborough United on 19 November, despite goalkeeper Jim Stannard suffering an injury and defender Mark Harris having to take over in goal.  Pulis quickly signed goalkeeper Andy Marshall on loan from Norwich City and he saved a penalty on his debut against York City, but Gillingham lost both that game and the next one, after which they had dropped to 20th in the table.  The team began December with a win over Crewe Alexandra and followed the victory with draws against two teams who were in the top six of the league table, Bury and Watford.  It was the first time that the team had gone three consecutive league games without losing during the season.  This short unbeaten run was followed, however, by a defeat at home to Luton Town on Boxing Day.  Gillingham's final match of 1996 was away to Burnley, who won 5–1; Onuora was sent off after receiving a second yellow card for angrily throwing the ball at the assistant referee.  The defeat left Gillingham 21st in the table, putting them in the relegation places.

January–May
Due to the postponement of a number of scheduled matches, the first league game of 1997 did not take place until 18 January and resulted in a 1–1 draw with Notts County. He scored his first goal for the club seven days later in a 4–1 victory over Plymouth Argyle, the team's biggest win of the season. Gillingham remained undefeated in the league in 1997 until the end of February, a run of six games. The team followed a win over Bristol Rovers on 8 February with victory over York City, the first time they had won two consecutive league games all season, and then gained a third consecutive win by defeating Peterborough United. After this run, Gillingham had climbed to 15th in the table.

In March, Fortune-West was fit again after his injury but could not regain a place in the team due to the form of Onuora and Akinbiyi and was sent on loan to Leyton Orient of the Third Division.  Gillingham began the month with a 3–2 defeat to Crewe Alexandra, the first time the team had lost in the league in 1997, but followed it up by defeating sixth-placed Watford, Butler scoring the winning goal against his former club in the final minute.  Beginning with the game against Wycombe Wanderers on 22 March, Onuora scored in five consecutive matches, making him only the seventh player to achieve this feat for Gillingham in the Football League.  The first three games of this run resulted in victories over Wycombe, Rotherham and Bristol City.  In the next game, against promotion-chasing Brentford, Onuora gave Gillingham the lead but their opponents scored twice to win;  Gillingham ended March 15th in the table.

Gillingham's first match of April resulted in a 2–2 draw against Chesterfield; Gillingham were winning until the final minute but then conceded an equalising goal.  Seven days later, Gillingham drew 2–2 against AFC Bournemouth in identical circumstances, conceding an equaliser in the 90th minute.  Butler scored in  both games and also scored in the next two, a victory over Stockport County and a defeat to Blackpool.  Gillingham ended the season with three consecutive 2–0 victories, defeating Millwall, Walsall and Shrewsbury.  Onuora scored two goals and Akinbiyi three during this run.  Gillingham finished the season in 11th place in the table, six points below the promotion play-off places.

Match details
Key

In result column, Gillingham's score shown first
H = Home match
A = Away match

pen. = Penalty kick
o.g. = Own goal

Results

Partial league table

Cup matches

FA Cup
As a Second Division team, Gillingham entered the 1996–97 FA Cup in the first round.  A goal from Butler gave Gillingham  1–0 victory over Hereford United of the Third Division.  In the second round, Gillingham played another Third Division team, Cardiff City, and won 2–0 with goals from Onuora and Hessenthaler.  The teams from the top two divisions of English football entered the competition in the third round and Gillingham were paired with Derby County of the FA Premier League.  The game took place on 14 January and by the midway point of the second half remained goalless, however the referee abandoned the match due to the frozen pitch.  The game was re-scheduled for a week later; with forwards Onuora, Akinbiyi and Bailey all unavailable due to injury or suspension, Gillingham played poorly and lost 2–0.

Match details
Key

In result column, Gillingham's score shown first
H = Home match
A = Away match

pen. = Penalty kick
o.g. = Own goal

Results

Football League Cup
As a Second Division team, Gillingham entered the 1996–97 Football League Cup in the first round and were drawn to play Swansea City of the Third Division.  Gillingham won the first leg of the two-legged tie 1–0 at Swansea's Vetch Field and then won the second leg at Priestfield 2–0 to progress 3–0 on aggregate.  In the second round, Gillingham played Barnsley of the First Division.  The first leg at Barnsley's Oakwell ground ended in a 1–1 draw and Gillingham won the second leg 1–0 to eliminate their higher-level opponents.  In the third round, Gillingham were paired with Coventry City of the FA Premier League.  The match drew an attendance of 10,603, the largest of the season at Priestfield.  Coventry scored two goals in the first half, but goals from Onuora and Ratcliffe in the second half earned Gillingham a draw.   The replay took place at Coventry's Highfield Road ground, and a second half goal from Neil Smith gave Gillingham a 1–0 win; Trevor Haylett of The Guardian attributed Gillingham's victory to their "compact, disciplined rearguard in which their three centre-halves stood tall all night against a Coventry attack whose ideas petered out after a bright opening spell".  It was the club's first victory over a team from the top division of English football since 1908 and first ever win over top-level opposition away from home.  Gillingham's opponents in the fourth round were Ipswich Town of the First Division.  A goal approximately 15 minutes from the end of the game gave Ipswich a 1–0 win and Gillingham, for whom Ratcliffe was sent off, were eliminated from the League Cup.  Bryant was missing from the Gillingham team and Pulis admitted after the match that this was because the defender had been accidentally shot in the leg while participating in field sports.

Match details
Key

In result column, Gillingham's score shown first
H = Home match
A = Away match

pen. = Penalty kick
o.g. = Own goal

Results

Football League Trophy
In the first round of the 1996–97 Football League Trophy, a tournament exclusively for Second and Third Division teams, Gillingham played Cardiff City of the Third Division.  The score was 1–1 after 90 minutes, but Cardiff scored a golden goal winner in extra time to eliminate Gillingham from the competition; it was the first time Gillingham had ever lost to such a goal.  The attendance of 1,193 was the lowest of the season at Priestfield.

Match details
Key

In result column, Gillingham's score shown first
H = Home match
A = Away match

pen. = Penalty kick
o.g. = Own goal

Results

Players

Thirty players made at least one appearance for Gillingham during the season.  Ratcliffe made the most, playing in 52 of the team's 57 games.  Smith played 51 times and five other players made more than 40 appearances. Two players made only one appearance each.  Richard Carpenter, who had played for Gillingham since 1990, played in one game at the start of the season before being transferred to Fulham.  Andrew Sambrook, a teenager from the club's youth team, made one appearance for the first team; the club offered him a professional contract at the end of the season, but he opted to accept a sporting scholarship to a university in the United States.

Fifteen players scored at least one goal for Gillingham during the season.  Onuora was the top scorer; he scored 21 times in the Second Division, once in the FA Cup, and once in the League Cup.  His total of 23 goals was the highest by a Gillingham player for five seasons; it was more than twice that of the next highest scorer, Butler, who achieved a total of 11 goals across all competitions.

FW = Forward, MF = Midfielder, GK = Goalkeeper, DF = Defender

Aftermath
At the end of the season, the Gordon Road stand at Priestfield was demolished and replaced with a new stand in the first significant redevelopment of the stadium for more than 30 years.  Harris and Smith left the club to join Cardiff City and Fulham respectively.  Following on from the strong finish to the 1996–97 season, Gillingham began the following season mounting a challenge for promotion, which would take the club to the second tier of English football for the first time, but the team ultimately fell short of the play-offs, finishing seventh.

References

Works cited

Gillingham F.C. seasons
Gillingham